Sal, SAL, or S.A.L. may refer to:

Personal name
 Sal (name), a list of people and fictional characters with the given name or nickname

Places
 Sal, Cape Verde, an island and municipality
 Sal, Iran, a village in East Azerbaijan Province
 Cay Sal, a small island between Florida, Cuba and the Bahamas
 Sal Glacier, Queen Maud Land, Antarctica
 Sal River (India), Goa
 Sal (Russia), a tributary of the Don in southern Russia

Arts and entertainment
 Sal (film), a 2011 film about Sal Mineo
 Laffing Sal, an automated character

Science
 Sal (tree) (Shorea robusta), from the Indian subcontinent
 Saharan Air Layer, or SAL
 Salivary lipocalin, or SAL, the pig major urinary protein homologue
 Society of Antiquaries of London, a British historical and archaeological learned society
 Sterility assurance level, or SAL, in microbiology

Transportation
 Seaboard Air Line Railroad, reporting mark SAL
 Sociedade de Aviação Ligeira, or SAL, Luanda, Angola, an air taxi operator
 Suid-Afrikaanse Lugdiens, or SAL, the Afrikaans name for South African Airways
 Swedish American Line, or SAL, a former passenger line
 Amílcar Cabral International Airport, also known as Sal International Airport, Cape Verde
 El Salvador International Airport, IATA code SAL

Other uses
 SAL Institute, an engineering college situated in Ahmedabad, Gujarat, India
 Sal languages, a family of Tibeto-Burman languages
 Salam Zgharta FC, a Lebanese association football club
 Saskatchewan Accelerator Laboratory, or SAL
 Semi-active laser, a laser guidance technique mostly used in military applications
 Shropshire (Salop), England, Chapman code SAL, in genealogy
 Société anonyme libanaise, or SAL
 Sons of the American Legion, or SAL, a patriotic service organization
 South Atlantic League, or SAL, a minor US baseball league
 Structural Adjustment Loan, or SAL, to developing countries
 Surface Air Lift/Surface Air Lifted, or SAL, a postal classification

See also
 Sall (disambiguation)
 Salle (disambiguation)
 Sally (disambiguation)
 Salo (disambiguation)